Belaunri is a village in Mohania block of Kaimur district, Bihar, India. It is located southeast of Mohania, near the Durgavati River. As of 2011, its population was 5,824, in 884 households.

References 

Villages in Kaimur district